Gudrun Witte (born 4 January 1962) is a German volleyball player. She competed in the women's tournament at the 1984 Summer Olympics.

References

External links
 

1962 births
Living people
German women's volleyball players
Olympic volleyball players of West Germany
Volleyball players at the 1984 Summer Olympics
Sportspeople from Munich